A costume shop is a space where costumes for theatrical or film productions are designed, built, and stored for the company or production. Costume designers, builders, seamstresses, and stitchers work in costume shops. The shops themselves can vary in size, from one large room to a house with multiple floors. Costumes from past productions, fabric, jewelry and accessories are often stored in the shop.

Purpose 
A costume shop is where the costumes worn on stage for a production are built. Some costume shops have washers for cleaning costumes, fitting rooms, racks for storage or spaces for designers to conceptualize a costume. Some shops allow rentals of their costumes. However, the most common and primary purpose for a costume shop is for building and finishing pieces that go onstage.

There is no standard layout for costume shops, though most have stations for stitching or surging, cutting tables, fabric storage, and finishing tables. A large an expansive costume shop style helps work to enable productions to be mounted lavishly and permit study and experimentation at the same time. The process of building a costume requires many steps and stations, which the costume designer first conceptualizes. But before building can begin, the designer must choose where the costumes will come from.

Once the show is designed, pieces can come from a multitude of places, but there are commonly four options:

 Rented, either from other theatres, businesses, or individuals
 Pulled, which refers to searching through a costume shops stock. That is, "pulling" from the rack of stored costumes.
 Constructed, ones that the designer and costume shop create themselves.
 Shopped, items that can be purchased from outside sources.

The costume shop will search, place orders, create, organize, and dole out the costumes for each production and each character in the manner that best fits the costume and production itself. For instance, not every shoe is cobbled in the shop, or "in house"; some are bought and some are borrowed.

Jobs within 
Within a costume shop, there are people working on different parts of the creative or accumulative process.  The size of the theatre or company will determine whether each job goes to one person, if a group of individuals share more than one job, or if everyone pitches in on everything.

Costume designer 
The costume designer is an integral part of the production's creative team. They work closely with the director to develop a look for the actors onstage that best serves the plot of the play and concept the director has envisioned. "The Costume Designer seeks inspiration from many sources, including interviews with the actors who will play the characters, and extensive historical and visual research." Whether the costume designer is a permanent position or a by-production hire will determine whether they are considered the head of the costume department or shop

Assistant designer 
The assistant designer helps the head designer with the jobs that must be completed. This includes but is not limited to research, shopping, rental acquisition and fittings for actors.

Cutter/draper 
The cutter/draper is responsible for making patterns, cutting, fitting and construction of costumes from specific designs or sketches supplied by the designer. "The Cutter may assist in selecting materials and supervising the costume construction." In most shops there are multiple cutters and drapers to ease and spread out work load.

Costume coordinator/supervisor/shop manager 
A shop manager is responsible for daily goings on in the shop, much like a manager in a building or restaurant. They deal with the costume budget from the producers, manufacturing and purchasing, as well as work and costume building schedules and production crew requirements.

Stitcher (sewer, seamstress, costume builder) 
A stitcher works on the actual construction of the costumes. The stitcher will sometimes assist during fittings to help with pinning and alterations. This is the entry-level position in a costume shop and often the most common job that is open in a space. A stitcher will help pick up wherever needed, often stretching out from fittings, pinning, and alteration, to textiles, dye working and errands.

See also 
 Costume designer
 Costume coordination

References

External links 
CWB Design Shopfitting

Theatre
Costumes